Live at the Isle of Wight Festival  is a double live album by The Who, recorded at the Isle of Wight Festival on 29 August 1970, and released in 1996. A DVD of the concert was also released for the first time in 1996.

Overview
The Who were one year and three months into their Tommy tour when they played their second engagement at the Isle of Wight Festival. As in 1969, they played most of their famous rock opera, which by this time was quite familiar to the festival crowd. Huge spotlights bathed the audience of between 600,000 and 700,000 attendees (according to the Guinness Book of Records) and as The Who's tour manager John Woolf recalls, attracted "every moth and flying nocturnal animal on the island". The Who started their set at 2:00 A.M.

By August 1970, Pete Townshend was already introducing new songs to the setlist including "Water", "I Don't Even Know Myself" and "Naked Eye". These songs, which were being recorded at the time of the festival, were intended for an upcoming project known as Lifehouse. Although Lifehouse was eventually abandoned, the sessions paved the way to the Who's classic album Who's Next.

The Who also performed some live staples such as "Substitute", "My Generation", "Magic Bus", "I Can't Explain", and the perennial covers of "Shakin' All Over" and "Summertime Blues".

Track listing
All songs were written by Pete Townshend except where noted.
Disc one

Disc two

Personnel
The Who
 Roger Daltrey – lead vocals, tambourine, harmonica.
 Pete Townshend – lead guitar and vocals
 John Entwistle – bass guitar, vocals
 Keith Moon – drums, percussion, vocals

Charts

References

The Who live albums
1996 live albums
Columbia Records live albums
Live video albums
1996 video albums
The Who video albums
Columbia Records video albums
Legacy Recordings live albums
Legacy Recordings video albums
Albums produced by Jon Astley
Tommy (rock opera)